Jane Mary Attenborough (30 September 1955 – 26 December 2004) was an English arts administrator and arts manager. The eldest daughter of the actor and filmmaker Richard Attenborough and the actress Sheila Sim, she was first employed as overseas membership secretary at the Royal Academy of Dance. Attenborough later joined the Arts Council of Great Britain to its national touring programme in 1979 before moving to the Rambert Dance Company as dance liaison officer, expanding its education programme from schools activities to local community events.

She died together with her daughter Lucy and mother in law in the Indian Ocean earthquake and tsunami while holidaying in Thailand on 26 December 2004.

Early life and education
Jane Mary Attenborough was born on 30 September 1955 in London. She was the eldest daughter of the actor and filmmaker Richard Attenborough and the actress Sheila Sim. Attenborough had two siblings: Michael and Charlotte. From her childhood, Attenborough was raised amongst people from the artistic world and she was focused on addressing a concern that many individuals lacked an opportunity to participate in the arts. Attenborough was educated at the Lady Eleanor Holles School in Hampton, before going on to enroll on a sociology course at the University of Sussex from 1973 to 1976.

Career
Attenborough's first role of employment was as overseas membership secretary at the Royal Academy of Dance for a short period of time in 1977. Attenborough subsequently joined the Arts Council of Great Britain and was assigned to its national touring programme, where she assisted the consultant Jodi Myers. In 1979, she joined the Rambert Dance Company as dance liaison officer, where she expanded its education programme from traditional schools activities to encompass local community events, before she was promoted to press and public relations officer, a position which she held from 1980 to 1984. After leaving the world of employment to raise a family, Attenborough was persuaded to join the National Organisation for Dance and Mime (later Dance UK) as administrator in 1985, leading its transformation from a minor lobbying group to an organisation with significant authority and impact.

She later became Dance UK's executive director, using managerial experience and fundraising events to contribute to the promotion of the dance world and improve the conditions in which dancers had. An initiative in which Attenborough was instrumental in the development of was the Healthier Dancer Programme to help dancers maintain their fitness and reduce the risk of injury. She also helped to establish the Digital Dance Awards in 1987, which allowed companies and choreographers to produce works that they could not have created beyond their normal financial means. In early 2000, the Paul Hamlyn Foundation had a vacancy for a job as arts manager and Attenborough was its successful applicant. There she was involved in multiple projects that introduced "at risk" individuals to the arts and had an increasing involvement in the Paul Hamlyn Foundation's support for employment in prisons.

In 1985, Attenborough became administrator for the National Organisation for Dance and Mime (later Dance UK). Attenborough was later promoted its executive director, expanding the organisation's activities to help companies and choreographers to produce works by ignoring financial means and developed a programme to maintain the fitness of dancers. She worked as arts manager for the Paul Hamlyn Foundation from early 2000, promoting music education in schools in North East England and established links with four London theatres. In her final years Attenborough was manager of the experimental Musical Futures project.

Furthermore, Attenborough was involved in the promotion of music education in schools in North East England and she led the Paul Hamlyn Performances at the Royal Opera House, introducing thousands of young people to opera. She additionally helped the foundation establish links with the Royal National Theatre, the Royal Court Theatre and the Sage Gateshead. She undertook other projects to provide audiences with opportunities to get involved in the arts. In her final years Attenborough was manager of the experimental Musical Futures project, working with the civil servant Claus Moser and project leader David Price. On the morning of 26 December 2004, she and her family were holidaying on the Khao Lak Beach in Thailand when the Indian Ocean earthquake and tsunami struck their villa, killing Attenborough, her daughter Lucy and her mother-in-law. Her husband Michael Holland (whom she married in 1982) and two other children survived her. In March 2005, she was given a memorial service at Southwark Cathedral, attended by her family, friends and colleagues.

After Attenborough's death, Dance UK established the Jane Attenborough One Dance UK Industry Award in her name and the Paul Hamlyn Foundation awarded the Jane Attenborough Dance in Education Fellowship to assist a retiring dancer transition to community and education work from 2005 to 2009. A drama and music facility at Waterford Kamhlaba in Eswatini and a small studio at the University of Sussex were named after her.

Personal life
Attenbrough's brother Michael described her as "intense", Moser called her an individual who had a "generous spirit, integrity, wisdom and involvement", and Myers noted her "infectious sense of humour" and "great charm". She was able to get individuals from many backgrounds to relax, and combined "great enthusiasm and passion with impressive administrative skills and acute sensitivity to the needs of artists and audiences."

Death

On 26 December 2004, Attenborough died in a tsunami in Thailand, at age 49. Her daughter, Lucy, and her mother-in-law, also died. Her husband, son, and another daughter survived.

Legacy
The Musical Features project of which she was manager expanded operations outside of the United Kingdom and one million young people took up the initiative. Dance UK established the Jane Attenborough One Dance UK Industry Award in recognition of "an individual working in dance who has made an outstanding contribution to the art form." From 2005 to 2009, the Paul Hamlyn Foundation honoured Attenborough with the two-year £50,000 Jane Attenborough Dance in Education Fellowship, which aimed "to enable a dance company to provide practical assistance, mentoring and training to help a dancer coming to the end of his or her career to make a successful transition to education and community work."

The Paul Hamlyn Foundation also funded the construction of a drama and music facility, the Jane Holland Creative Centre for Learning at Waterford Kamhlaba in Eswatini, which was opened by Lord & Lady Attenborough in November 2006 in honour of their eldest daughter. Her alma mater, the University of Sussex, named a small studio in the Attenborough Centre for the Creative Arts after her in 2015.

References

External links
 

1955 births
2004 deaths
Jane
People from London
People educated at Lady Eleanor Holles School
Alumni of the University of Sussex
Women arts administrators
British arts administrators
20th-century English women
20th-century English people
21st-century English women
21st-century English people
Victims of the 2004 Indian Ocean earthquake and tsunami
Natural disaster deaths in Thailand
Daughters of life peers